A transit village is a pedestrian-friendly mixed-use district or neighborhood oriented around the station of a high-quality transit system, such as rail or B.R.T.  Often a civic square of public space abuts the train station, functioning as the hub or centerpiece of the surrounding community and encouraging social interaction.  While mainly residential in nature, many transit villages offer convenience retail and services to residents heading to and from train stations.

The term "transit villages" was popularized in the 1997 book by Michael Bernick and Robert Cervero, Transit Villages for the 21st Century, whose cover shows a mixed-use, pedestrian-friendly community infilling what then was a surface park-and-ride lot of the Pleasant Hill BART station area, and what is now the Contra Costa Centre Transit Village.  In their book, the authors distinguished transit villages from transit-oriented development (TOD) as more residential-oriented in land-use composition, with neighborhood retail and services provided in and around the rail station and a prominent civic space immediate to the station.

Portland, Oregon has actively pursued transit village style development along the Portland area light rail known as Metropolitan Area Express (MAX). California is also exploring transit village development options for its evolving transit systems.

Miami, Florida has placed large affordable housing complexes at its two least used Metrorail stations, one is known as the Brownsville Transit Village and the other is Santa Clara Apartments. Miami-Dade Transit has its headquarters in the Overtown Transit Village building at one of its downtown stations.

New Jersey Transit, the New Jersey Department of Transportation, and some local communities in New Jersey are working on developing transit villages in locations such as Hamilton Township, Mercer County, New Jersey along New Jersey Transit's Northeast Corridor rail line and Somerville, New Jersey along New Jersey Transit's Raritan Valley Line rail line. The effort is termed Transit Village Initiative.

New Jersey Transit Village Initiative 
New Jersey has become a national leader in promoting Transit Village development. The New Jersey Department of Transportation established the Transit Village Initiative in 1999, offering multi-agency assistance and grants from the annual $1 million Transit village fund to any municipality with a ready to go project specifying appropriate mixed land-use strategy, available property, station-area management, and commitment to affordable housing, job growth, and culture. Transit village development must also preserve the architectural integrity of historically significant buildings. Since 1999 the state has made 34 Transit Village designations, which are in different stages of development:

Pleasantville (1999), Morristown (1999), Rutherford (1999), South Amboy (1999), South Orange (1999), Riverside (2001), Rahway (2002), Metuchen (2003), Belmar (2003), Bloomfield (2003), Bound Brook (2003), Collingswood (2003), Cranford (2003), Matawan (2003), New Brunswick (2005), Journal Square/Jersey City (2005), Netcong (2005), Elizabeth/Midtown (2007), Burlington City (2007), the City of Orange Township (2009), Montclair (2010), Somerville (2010), Linden (2010), West Windsor (2012), East Orange (2012), Dunellen (2012), Summit (2013), Plainfield (2014), Park Ridge (2015), Irvington (2015) Hackensack (2016), Long Branch (2016), Asbury Park (2017), and Newark (2021).

See also 

 Commuter town

 New Urbanism

 Principles of Intelligent Urbanism
 Smart growth
 

 
 
 Urban sprawl

References

External links 
 Transit Oriented Development
 transitvillages.org

Urban planning